DVI is Digital Visual Interface, a video interface for digital displays.

DVI may also refer to:

Science and technology
 Device independent file format, a file format used by the TeX typesetting system
 Direct voice input, human computer interaction by voice command
 Digital Video Interactive, a 1980s standard for full-motion desktop video
 Digital Visual Interface
 dvi (prefix), a prefix used to make provisional names of undiscovered chemical elements

Music
 Daemon Viam Invenient, a 2007 album by Czech black metal group Root
 Double Vulgar II, the fourth album by Thighpaulsandra

Organisations
 District Court of the Virgin Islands, a United States territorial court
 Deuel Vocational Institution, a California state prison

Other uses
 506 (number) in Roman numerals
 506, the year 
 Disaster victim identification, an international system for the identification of victims of a disaster; see forensic archaeology

See also
 D6 (disambiguation), including a list of topics named D.VI, etc.